Trevor McNevan is a Canadian singer who is best known as the lead singer, songwriter and rapper of Thousand Foot Krutch, lead singer and songwriter of pop punk side project FM Static along with Steve Augustine (the fourth Thousand Foot Krutch drummer), and rapper and songwriter of hip hop side-project I Am the Storm. His first band, Oddball, included Dave Smith (guitar) and Tim Baxter (bass), as well as drummer Neil Sanderson. Oddball released the 27-song record Shutterbug, in 1995, featuring half hip-hop and half rock songs.

McNevan is the only original member of Thousand Foot Krutch. He formed the band in Peterborough, Ontario in 1995, along with original guitarist Dave Smith.

McNevan also co-produced the Thousand Foot Krutch album Welcome to the Masquerade and FM Static's album My Brain Says Stop, But My Heart Says Go!.

Thousand Foot Krutch

McNevan is a founding member of alternative metal band Thousand Foot Krutch and is the only remaining original member, although the current line-up of the band has remained consistent since 2002. The band has released eight studio albums and two live CD/DVD albums. In 2017 the band entered an indefinite hiatus, although they have not officially disbanded.

FM Static

McNevan started the pop punk band FM Static with drummer Steve Augustine, Guitarist John Bunner and Bassist Justin Smith. The band has released four studio albums.

I Am the Storm

Shortly after entering a hiatus with Thousand Foot Krutch,
McNevan focused on a new project that returned him to his musical roots. McNevan announced his solo hip-hop project I Am the Storm in early 2018. After a successful campaign on crowdfunding site PledgeMusic, he released Fight Musik, Vol. 1 in mid-September of that year.

Other work

McNevan co-wrote and co-produced Hawk Nelson's first album, Letters to the President and co-wrote their second, third, and fourth albums: Smile, It's The End of the World, Hawk Nelson Is My Friend, and Live Life Loud. He also co-wrote the song "Bring 'Em Out" with the band for the movie Yours, Mine and Ours, in which the band also performed. McNevan also starred in Hawk Nelson's "California" music video as the driver of the Jeep.

McNevan is primarily attributed with the discovery and promotion of Canadian Christian rapper Manafest.  Since 2005, he has been a featured vocalist in the rapper's releases a total of nine times and frequently co-writes songs with Manafest for his projects.

McNevan has his own publishing company, "Teerawk Music", that houses his various songwriting, developing, and production ventures. Outside of TFK and FM Static, he has written songs for TobyMac, Hawk Nelson, Remedy Drive, Decyfer Down, Wavorly, Worth Dying For, Demon Hunter, KJ-52, Manafest, the Letter Black, Nine Lashes, Aliegh Baumhardt, and many others.

McNevan is a good friend of Nashville Predators NHL player Mike Fisher, and wrote a goal song for Fisher, only used at the Senators' home arena Scotiabank Place when Mike scores.

Guest appearances

from:

References

External links
Teerawk Music Publishing
Trevor McNevan talks about working at McDonald's with Three Days Grace

Living people
Canadian Christians
Canadian male singers
Canadian rock singers
Musicians from Peterborough, Ontario
Canadian heavy metal guitarists
Canadian male guitarists
Canadian heavy metal singers
Year of birth missing (living people)
Nu metal singers